Clay Township is a township in Jones County, Iowa.

History
Clay Township was organized in 1844.

References

Populated places in Jones County, Iowa
Townships in Iowa